Roger Rees (5 May 1944 – 10 July 2015) was a Welsh actor and director, widely known for his stage work. He won an Olivier Award and a Tony Award for his performance as the lead in The Life and Adventures of Nicholas Nickleby. He also received Obie Awards for his role in The End of the Day and as co-director of Peter and the Starcatcher. Rees was posthumously inducted into the American Theater Hall of Fame in November 2015.

He was widely known to American television audiences for playing the characters Robin Colcord in Cheers and Lord John Marbury in The West Wing. Americans also know him as the Sheriff of Rottingham in Mel Brooks' Robin Hood: Men in Tights.

Early life
Rees was born in Aberystwyth, Cardiganshire, Wales, the son of Doris Louise (née Smith), a shop clerk, and William John Rees, a police officer. He and his parents moved to Balham, London, where he grew up. He studied art at the Camberwell College of Arts and the Slade School of Fine Art, turning to acting when he was painting backdrops at the Wimbledon Theatre and was asked to fill a part in a play.

Career

Rees continued his career with the Royal Shakespeare Company. He played Malcolm in the acclaimed Trevor Nunn 1976 stage and 1978 television production of Macbeth. Rees created the title role in the original production of The Life and Adventures of Nicholas Nickleby, David Edgar's stage adaptation of the Charles Dickens novel, winning a Laurence Olivier Award for Actor of the Year in a New Play in 1980 and a Tony Award for Best Actor in a Play in 1982. A recorded version of the play also earned him an Emmy nomination in 1983. He also starred in the original production of The Real Thing by Tom Stoppard at the Strand Theatre in London in 1982.

Rees began to work in television during the 1980s, appearing opposite Laurence Olivier in The Ebony Tower (1984). That same year, Rees portrayed Fred Hollywell in A Christmas Carol, which he also narrated, starring George C. Scott as Scrooge. In 1986, he played William Tyndale in God's Outlaw. From 1988 to 1991 he starred in the British sitcom Singles, with co-star Judy Loe. From 1989 to 1991 and in 1993, he also appeared intermittently on the long-running American television series Cheers as the English business tycoon Robin Colcord, a love interest for Rebecca Howe (Kirstie Alley). He played British Ambassador Lord John Marbury in several episodes of The West Wing from 2000 to 2005. His later television appearances also include My So-Called Life as substitute teacher Mr. Racine, and James MacPherson on Warehouse 13. His film career began in the 1980s. Rees played the Sheriff of Rottingham in the Mel Brooks movie Robin Hood: Men in Tights (1993). Rees' later film appearances include Frida (2002), The Prestige (2006), and The Pink Panther (2006).

Continuing his work in the theatre through the 1990s, both as an actor and a director, Rees was awarded an Obie Award for his 1992 performance in the Off-Broadway play The End of the Day. In 1995, he was nominated for a Tony Award for Best Actor in a Play for his role in Indiscretions. He recorded many audiobooks, including Memnoch the Devil by Anne Rice.

From November 2004 to October 2007, Rees was artistic director of the Williamstown Theatre Festival, only the fourth person to hold the post in its half-century history. He replaced Nathan Lane in the role of Gomez Addams in the Broadway musical adaptation of The Addams Family, on 22 March 2011 and remained until the end of the run on 31 December 2011.

In 2012, Rees took his one-man Shakespeare show, What You Will, to London's West End, playing a three-week engagement at the Apollo Theatre.

In 2013, Rees directed Crispin Whitell's play, The Primrose Path, at the Guthrie Theater in Minneapolis.
In 2014, Rees directed Dog and Pony, a musical written by Rick Elice and Michael Patrick Walker, which had its world premiere at the Old Globe Theatre in San Diego.

His last role was as Anton Schell in the musical version of The Visit, opposite Chita Rivera, which opened on Broadway on 23 April 2015 and closed on 14 June 2015. Rees left the production in May 2015 owing to his illness.

Rees was to have directed a new musical written by Elice and Will Van Dyke, Magnificent Climb, in the fall of 2016 at MCC Theater in New York City. He was also scheduled to perform his one-man Shakespeare show, What You Will in New York in the autumn of 2015, and had hoped to return to the Royal Shakespeare Company for a stint in Don Quixote in 2016. He was inducted into the exclusive entertainment fraternity, the Grand Order of Water Rats, as a full member.

Personal life
Rees lived in the United States for more than 25 years and became a naturalized American citizen in 1989. He converted to Judaism in the 1980s. Rees married his partner of 33 years, playwright Rick Elice, in 2011, shortly after same-sex marriage in New York was legalised. Rees and Elice also collaborated professionally, including as co-playwrights of the comedic thriller Double Double. Elice co-wrote (with Marshall Brickman) the libretto for The Addams Family musical, the cast of which Rees had joined on 22 March 2011. In 2012, Elice and Rees received Tony Award nominations for Elice's stage adaptation and Rees' co-direction (with Alex Timbers), respectively, of Peter and the Starcatcher. In October 2017, Elice wrote a memoir of his life with Rees, entitled Finding Roger: An Improbably Theatrical Love Story.

Illness and death
After a diagnosis of brain cancer in October 2014, Rees focused his energy on his commitment to playing opposite Chita Rivera on Broadway in The Visit, the final musical written by John Kander and Fred Ebb. While undergoing two brain surgeries, two courses of radiation and ongoing chemotherapy, Rees managed to rehearse, preview and open in The Visit on 23 April 2015. By the middle of May, it had become too difficult for him to speak, and he left the show. Rees died at age 71 at his home in New York City on 10 July 2015. On Wednesday, 15 July 2015, the marquee lights at all the theatres on Broadway were dimmed in his honour. His ashes were scattered in the Atlantic Ocean. Two months later, there was a memorial service for him at Broadway's New Amsterdam Theatre. On 16 November 2015, Rees was inducted, posthumously, into the Broadway Theatre Hall of Fame.

Filmography

Film

Television

Theatre

 The Comedy of Errors (as Antipholus of Syracuse), Stratford-on-Avon and London, 1976
 Three Sisters (as Tusenbach) Stratford-upon-Avon London and tour, 1979
 "The Suicide" by Nikolai Erdman (as Semyon Semyonovich). Royal Shakespeare Company. 1979.
 Cymbeline (as Posthumus), Royal Shakespeare Company, Stratford-on-Avon 1979
 Cymbeline (as Posthumus), Royal National Theatre, 1980
 The Life and Adventures of Nicholas Nickleby (as Nicholas Nickleby), Royal Shakespeare Company
Aldwych Theatre, London, June 1980 – June 1981
Plymouth Theatre, Broadway, September 1981 – March 1982
 The Real Thing (as Henry), London, 1982
 Hapgood by Tom Stoppard  as Kerner, London March 1988
 Hamlet as Hamlet, Royal Shakespeare Company, Stratford upon Avon, 1984
 The End of the Day (as Graydon Massey), Playwrights Horizons, off-Broadway, 1992
 Indiscretions (as George), Ethel Barrymore Theatre, Broadway, 1995
 A Man of No Importance (as Alfie Byrne), Mitzi E. Newhouse Theater, off-Broadway, 2002
 Waiting for Godot (as Vladimir, replacing Patrick Stewart), Haymarket Theatre, London, 2010
 Waiting for Godot (as Vladimir), His Majesty's Theatre, Perth, 2010
 Waiting for Godot (as Vladimir), Her Majesty's Theatre, Adelaide, 2010
 Waiting for Godot (as Vladimir), Comedy Theatre, Melbourne, 2010
 [[The Addams Family (musical)|The Addams Family]] (as Gomez [Replaced Nathan Lane]), Broadway, 2011
 Peter and the Starcatcher (co-director with Alex Timbers), Broadway, 2012 (and then it moved to an Off-Broadway theatre in 2013)
 What You Will (Actor, Writer, Director) Apollo Theater, London 2012
 Herringbone (Director) 2012
 The Primrose Path (Director), Guthrie Theater, 2013
 The Winslow Boy (as Arthur Winslow), American Airlines Theatre, Broadway, 2013
 Dog and Pony (Director) Old Globe Theater 2014
 The Visit'' (musical version; as Anton Schell), Broadway, 2015

References

External links
 
 
 
 Article on appointment to Williamstown Theater Festival

1944 births
2015 deaths
20th-century Welsh male actors
21st-century Welsh male actors
21st-century British dramatists and playwrights
Alumni of the Slade School of Fine Art
Audiobook narrators
Deaths from brain cancer in the United States
Converts to Judaism
Welsh gay writers
Welsh gay actors
Jewish British male actors
Laurence Olivier Award winners
LGBT theatre directors
Welsh LGBT dramatists and playwrights
Gay Jews
Gay dramatists and playwrights
Obie Award recipients
People from Aberystwyth
People with acquired American citizenship
Royal Shakespeare Company members
Tony Award winners
Welsh emigrants to the United States
Welsh Jews
Welsh male film actors
Welsh male stage actors
Welsh male television actors
Welsh male voice actors
Welsh theatre directors
20th-century Welsh dramatists and playwrights
20th-century Welsh LGBT people
21st-century Welsh LGBT people
20th-century British Jews
21st-century British Jews